Escalade Inc., known as Escalade Sports, is a sporting goods manufacturer, distributor, and retailer based in Evansville, Indiana. It trades on NASDAQ as ESCA.

History
In November 2019, CEO David L. Fetherman announced his intent to retire, but would stay on until a successor was chosen. In March 2020, Escalade announced a new CEO, Scott J. Sincerbeaux, formerly an executive at Wolverine World Wide.

During the COVID-19 pandemic, Escalade received $5.6 million in federally backed small business loans as part of the Paycheck Protection Program. The company received scrutiny over this loan, which was aimed at small businesses. The company has access to a $50 million line of credit, has said they have a "strong balance sheet", and have seen increased demand for their products. Escalade paid the entire $5.6 million back on April 28, 2020, two days after the New York Times article.

In October 2020, Escalade acquired American Heritage Billiards for $1.55 million.

In 2022, Life Fitness agreed to sell its Brunswick Billiards business unit to Escalade for $32 million.

Notable brands
Escalade owns or distributes the following notable brands:
 Accudart (and a stake in Winmau)
 Stiga Sports
 Ping-Pong
 Prince Sports (aka 'prince')
 Bear Archery, also including the following brands:
 Cajun Bowfishing
 SIK – broadheads
 Trophy Ridge – bow accessories

Subsidiaries
 Escalade Sports
 Indian Industries, Inc.
 Bear Archery, Inc.
 EIM Company, Inc.
 Escalade Insurance, Inc.
 Escalade Sports Playground, Inc.
 Harvard Sports, Inc.
 SOP Services, Inc.
 US Weight, Inc.
 Wedcor Holdings, Inc.
 Goalsetter Systems, Inc.
 Lifeline Products, LLC
 Victory Made, LLC
 Victory Tailgate, LLC

References

External links
 

Sporting goods manufacturers of the United States